William Mackenzie (of  Ludgate Hill, Edinburgh and Dublin) was a well-known publisher of natural history books in the 1870s. He published works by the trio of Francis Orpen Morris, Benjamin Fawcett and Alexander Francis Lydon. His best-known publication was probably County Seats of The Noblemen and Gentlemen of Great Britain and Ireland in 1870.

Books published

British Fresh Water Fishes (1879)Rev. W. Houghton (author), Alexander Francis Lydon (1836–1917) (artist), Benjamin Fawcett (1808–1893) (printer): Colour plates of British fresh water fish in two volumes. The 41 colour plates generally show fish against a natural background or swimming in an underwater setting. The volumes show 38 engraved heading views of regions where the fish occur with diagrams. The text describes the species and their habitats. The volumes are bound in embossed covers with a vignette of an angler holding a fish and freshwater fish motifs in the corners.
County Seats of The Noblemen and Gentlemen of Great Britain and Ireland (1870) Rev. Francis Orpen Morris, Benjamin Fawcett and Alexander Francis Lydon.
Wilson's Tales of the Borders and of Scotland: Historical, Traditionary, and Imaginative.  The most complete edition known of the stories published by John Mackay Wilson in Berwick-on-Tweed from 1834 onwards.  The stories were published in the Berwick Advertiser initially, but rapidly gained a wider following and were republished in collected form by several publishers. William Mackenzie published a complete set in 6 volumes. Precise publishing date unknown. 
The National Encyclopedia: A Dictionary of Universal Knowledge New edition published between 1891 and 1901. Sold by subscription.
The Scots Worthies: Their Lives and Testimonies.  Including many additional notes, and lives of eminent Worthies not contained in the original collection. Edited by Rev. J.A. Wylie LL.D., assisted by Rev. James Anderson. with an Introductory Sketch of the History of the Period BY THE EDITOR.  London: William Mackenzie, Ludgate Hill, E.C. Edinburgh and Glasgow.Upper Egypt and Ethiopia'' by Francis Frith, an edition photographically illustrated with 37 albumen prints pasted in the volume. The album was published after the 1862.

Scottish book publishers (people)
Year of birth missing
Year of death missing